The Mothers of Plaza de Mayo is a 1985 Argentine documentary film directed by Susana Blaustein Muñoz and Lourdes Portillo about the Mothers of the Plaza de Mayo. It was nominated for an Academy Award for Best Documentary Feature.

References

External links

The Mothers of Plaza de Mayo in the  Women Make Movies catalog
Lourdes Portillo retrospective at the Museum of Modern Art in New York City, 22–30 June.

1985 films
1985 documentary films
1980s Spanish-language films
Argentine documentary films
Films directed by Susana Blaustein Muñoz
Films directed by Lourdes Portillo
Documentary films about Latin American military dictatorships
Documentary films about women
1980s Argentine films